Duncan Dunbar (1803–1862) was a Scottish businessman and  London-based shipowner who established what was described as the largest shipping line in Great Britain. He was also the first chairman and founder of the London Chartered Bank of Australia.

Early life 
Duncan was born on 8 September 1803 at 7 Fore Street, Limehouse, Middlesex. His father Duncan Dunbar senior had moved to London in the 1790s and founded a successful business as a brewer and wine merchant. He settled in Limehouse, London in the 1790s, establishing his alcohol business at Dunbar wharf. Duncan junior was 22 when his father died in 1825 and inherited the business with his brother John.

Business 
Duncan junior possessed the largest sailing fleet in the world in the mid-19th century. Most of his fleets were built in his own shipyard in Moulmein, Burma. He also founded the London Chartered Bank of Australia in 1852. He died at his home at Porchester Terrace, Paddington on 6 March 1862. Duncan left £1,500,000 in his will. All 39 of his ships were sold within two years of his death.

References

1803 births
1862 deaths
19th-century English businesspeople